Laucala Airport  is serving Laucala, one of three small islands lying to the east of Thurston Point on the island of Taveuni in Northern Division of Fiji. The privately owned island is the site of the exclusive Laucala Resort.

Airlines and destinations

References

External links 
 

Airports in Fiji